FC Zenit-2 Saint Petersburg is a Russian football team from Saint Petersburg. It plays in the FNL 2 (third level). It is a farm club for the Russian Premier League team FC Zenit Saint Petersburg.

History
Zenit's reserve squad played professionally as Zenit-2 (Russian Second League in 1993, Russian Second Division from 1998 to 2000) and Zenit-d (Russian Third League from 1994 to 1997). Another team that was founded as Lokomotiv-Zenit-2 played as Zenit-2 in the Russian Second Division from 2001 to 2008. By 2008, there was no relation between that team and FC Zenit. Another farm club called FC Smena-Zenit debuted in the Russian Second Division in 2009, taking the spot of the former FC Zenit-2. FC Smena-Zenit was dissolved after the 2009 season because it did not fulfill Zenit's initial expectations.  Zenit-2 reentered professional football in the 2013–14 season in the Russian Professional Football League.

In the 2014–15 season, Zenit-2 came in second in its PFL zone behind FC Spartak-2 Moscow. When FC Torpedo Armavir (which qualified for promotion from the Zone South) refused to be promoted to FNL for financial reasons, the league offered the second-placed teams in the PFL an FNL spot. Zenit-2 was the only one who applied and played in the second-tier competition for the first time in their history in 2015–16. Zenit-2 finished the 2017–18 season in the relegation zone, but was saved from going down due to several teams above them failing licensing. At the end of the 2018–19 season it was relegated back to the PFL.

Current squad
As of 22 February 2023, according to the Second League website.

References

External links
  

Association football clubs established in 2013
Football clubs in Saint Petersburg
FC Zenit Saint Petersburg
2013 establishments in Russia